ORP Czajka was a Jaskółka class minesweeper of the Polish Navy at the outset of World War II. It was built by the riverine shipyard at Modlin. Czajka participated in the defense of Poland during the Nazi German invasion of 1939.

A subsequent Projekt 206FM class minehunter was commissioned as Czajka (624) in 1967.

References

Jaskółka-class minesweepers
Ships built in Poland
Naval ships of Poland captured by Germany during World War II
Maritime incidents in October 1939
Scuttled vessels